James Roy Newman (1907–1966) was an American mathematician and mathematical historian. He was also a lawyer, practicing in the state of New York from 1929 to 1941. During and after World War II, he held several positions in the United States government, including Chief Intelligence Officer at the US Embassy in London, Special Assistant to the Undersecretary of War, and Counsel to the US Senate Committee on Atomic Energy. In the latter capacity, he helped to draft the Atomic Energy Act of 1946. He became a member of the board of editors for Scientific American beginning in 1948. He is also credited for coining and first describing the mathematical concept "googol" in his book (co-authored by Edward Kasner) Mathematics and The Imagination.

Author 
In 1940 Newman wrote (with Edward Kasner) Mathematics and the Imagination in which he identified the mathematical concept of a very large but finite number, which he called "googol" and another large number called "googolplex" — this was the first time this number, and this term, were identified. In 1942 Newman wrote The Tools of War, which was an illustrated examination of warfare. In 1948 he published The control of atomic energy. In 1955 he wrote What is Science and in 1956 he published The World of Mathematics, a four volume library on the literature of mathematics from A'h-mosé the Scribe to Albert Einstein, presented with commentaries and notes (1956). The four volume series covers many branches of mathematics and represents a 15-year effort by Newman to collect what he felt were the most important essays in the field. With essays ranging from a biography of Srinivasa Ramanujan by Newman to Bertrand Russell's Definition of Number, the series is often praised as suitable for any level of mathematical skill. The series has been reprinted several times by various publishers. Newman also wrote Gödel's Proof (1958) with Ernest Nagel, presenting the main results of Gödel's incompleteness theorem and the mathematical work and philosophies leading up to its discovery in a more accessible manner. This book inspired Douglas Hofstadter to take up the study of mathematical logic, write his famous book Gödel, Escher, Bach, and prepare a second edition of Gödel's Proof, published in 2002. In 1961 Newman wrote Science and Sensibility, in 1962 The Rule of Folly and in 1963 The Harper Encyclopedia of Science.

References
 1948: The Control of Atomic Energy via Internet Archive

External links
 Obituary: J.R. Newman, The New York Times 29 May, 1966
 "Where Are You When I Need You, James R. Newman?", a poem by Lionel E. Deimel dedicated to Newman and The World of Mathematics.
 "The World of Mathematics by James R. Newman"—a 1989 book review in the journal Nature by David E. H. Jones.

1907 births
1966 deaths
20th-century  American  mathematicians
American historians of mathematics
20th-century  American  historians